Jan Halvor Halvorsen (born 8 March 1963, in Bamble) is a former Norwegian football player and the current manager of Lyn.

Club career

Halvorsen started his youth career in Pors, debuting at the age of fifteen and a half. He has also played for clubs like Brann, Rosenborg and Hertha Berlin. In 1992, he became Danish cup winner playing for AGF Aarhus.

National team

Halvorsen has five caps for the Norwegian national team.

Managerial career

Since 1996 Halvorsen has worked as football manager, managing top teams from Norway and Sweden. In 1999, he took over as manager for Start and led the club to promotion to the Norwegian Premier League. In 2000, he led the recently promoted side to the semi-finals of the Norwegian Football Cup. After being relegated to Adeccoligaen, he once again led the club to promotion back to the Norwegian Premier League in 2001.

In 2003, he joined Sogndal and helped the club to an 8th-place finish in his first season in charge of the Norwegian Premier League side. In November 2005, he signed a contract with Notodden, bringing them up from the Norwegian Second Division up to Adeccoligaen, the second highest level in Norway. He remained with Notodden thru 2009.

During October 2010 it was reported that Halvorsen would be joining New York Red Bulls during the 2011 season to serve as the club's assistant manager under Hans Backe. This move reunited Halvorsen with former Start boss Erik Solér who was in charge of New York at the time. His sons, Torben and Jonas also played on the Red Bulls youth teams. On 17 January 2011 it was officially announced that Halvorsen would join New York Red Bulls as an assistant coach.

Halvorsen signed a three-year contract with the Norwegian First Division side Bodø/Glimt ahead of the 2013 season, and replaced Cato Hansen as head coach and stated that the goal was to win promotion to Tippeligaen. And on his first attempt, he managed just that.

Managerial statistics

Honours
Danish Cup: 1991–92

References

External links
 
 Norwegian League stats 

1963 births
Living people
People from Bamble
Norwegian footballers
Pors Grenland players
Eik-Tønsberg players
FK Jerv players
SK Brann players
IK Start players
Hertha BSC players
Aarhus Gymnastikforening players
Sogndal Fotball players
Rosenborg BK players
Byåsen Toppfotball players
Danish Superliga players
Bundesliga players
2. Bundesliga players
Norwegian expatriate footballers
Expatriate men's footballers in Denmark
Expatriate footballers in Germany
Norwegian football managers
IK Start managers
Sogndal Fotball managers
GIF Sundsvall managers
FK Bodø/Glimt managers
Norwegian expatriate football managers
Expatriate football managers in Sweden
New York Red Bulls non-playing staff
Notodden FK managers
Association football defenders
Norway under-21 international footballers
Norway international footballers
Bryne FK managers
Eliteserien managers
Sportspeople from Vestfold og Telemark